Jane Getz (born 12 September 1942) is an American jazz pianist and session musician.

She learned classical piano as a child and began playing jazz at the age of nine. She lived in California early in life but when she was sixteen moved to New York City. She found work with Pony Poindexter and later performed with Charles Mingus, Herbie Mann, Stan Getz, Roland Kirk, Jay Clayton, Charles Lloyd, and Pharoah Sanders.

In the early 1970s, Getz returned to Los Angeles and became a studio musician. She recorded country music for RCA under the name "Mother Hen" and appeared on albums by The Bee Gees, Ringo Starr, Harry Nilsson, Rick Roberts, and John Lennon. She wrote the title track for the 1973 Jimmie Spheeris album The Original Tap Dancing Kid.

Getz went into semi-retirement but began playing jazz again in the 1990s. She was a member of Dale Fielder's quartet in Los Angeles in 1995. Her first jazz album as a leader, No Relation, was released in 1996.

Discography

As leader
 Mother Hen (1971)
 No Ordinary Child (1972)
 Survival Of The Hippest/Stopping Traffic 45rpm (1986)
 No Relation (1996)
 A Dot On The Map (2014)
 Go Back to Your Wife (2018)

As sidewoman
With Harry Nilsson
 1974 Pussy Cats 
 1975 Duit on Mon Dei
 1976 ...That's the Way It Is

With Jimmie Spheeris
 1973 The Original Tap Dancing Kid 
 1975 The Dragon Is Dancing

With Ringo Starr
 1976 Ringo's Rotogravure 
 1981 Stop and Smell the Roses

With others
 1964 Right Now: Live at the Jazz Workshop, Charles Mingus (Fantasy)
 1965 Pharoah's First, Pharoah Sanders
 1967 Musart, George Braith
 1970 Outlaw, Eugene McDaniels (Gene McDaniels)
 1972 Windmills, Rick Roberts
 1973 Life in a Tin Can, Bee Gees
 1976 Motion, Geoff Muldaur
 1998 Bop Head, Dave Pike
 2008 Introducing J'Ai Michel, Sweet Baby J'ai

References

1942 births
American jazz pianists
American session musicians
Living people
20th-century American pianists
20th-century American women pianists
21st-century American pianists
21st-century American women pianists